The canton of Val-de-Saire is an administrative division of the Manche department, northwestern France. It was created at the French canton reorganisation which came into effect in March 2015. Its seat is in Saint-Vaast-la-Hougue.

It consists of the following communes:

 Anneville-en-Saire
 Aumeville-Lestre
 Barfleur
 Brillevast
 Canteloup
 Carneville
 Clitourps
 Crasville
 Fermanville
 Gatteville-le-Phare
 Gonneville-le-Theil
 Maupertus-sur-Mer
 Montfarville
 Octeville-l'Avenel
 La Pernelle
 Quettehou
 Réville
 Sainte-Geneviève
 Saint-Pierre-Église
 Saint-Vaast-la-Hougue
 Teurthéville-Bocage
 Théville
 Tocqueville
 Valcanville
 Varouville
 Le Vast
 Le Vicel
 Vicq-sur-Mer
 Videcosville

References

Cantons of Manche